"Life of the Party" is a song by American rappers Kanye West and André 3000. It was intended for West's tenth studio album Donda (2021), but was left off the album due to André 3000 not agreeing to his verse being edited to a clean version. The song was later leaked by Canadian rapper Drake on Sound 42 radio amidst a feud with West. It was initially  released as an exclusive to the Donda Stem Player in October 2021. The song was released fully in November 2021 on the deluxe version of Donda, and an explicit version as a single.

Background
On July 16, 2021, rapper Consequence posted a video to Instagram of West in the studio with Tyler, the Creator, with a snippet of "Life of the Party" being played. On July 18, the original version of the song (which did not include any vocals from André 3000) was previewed at a private listening event in Las Vegas. West played the song for German news outlet Bild in Berlin on September 2, stating that a video shoot was planned and that he wanted to release it soon.

Leak
In the lead up to Donda releasing, West had taken shots aimed at Drake, even posting his home address to his Instagram. On September 4, a day after Canadian rapper Drake released his album Certified Lover Boy, Drake leaked "Life of the Party" on his Sound 42 radio show on Sirius XM amidst a feud with West. This version leaked by Drake seemed to have a different verse from West with disses aimed at Drake, as well as a guest verse from André 3000. André 3000 made a statement about the leak saying that West had reached out to him a few weeks prior to the song leaking to be part of Donda and was inspired to make a musical tribute to his mom. The song ended up being omitted from the album due to West's stance on profanity and André 3000 not agreeing to his verse being edited to be clean without having the raw original available. Moreover, the original version of the song André 3000 wrote to, did not have the diss verse aimed at Drake. André 3000 lamented that the song leaked with the diss verse, stating "It’s unfortunate that it was released in this way and two artists that I love are going back and forth".

Release
A new version of the track, containing the original verse from West and a censored verse from André 3000, was released on the Donda Stem Player on October 27, 2021. The track was released along with two other previously unreleased tracks titled "Never Abandon Your Family" and "Up from the Ashes", as well as the original version of "Remote Control", containing a verse from Kid Cudi. The song was released as part of the deluxe version of Donda, and as a single for the explicit version on November 14, 2021.

Reception
Andre 3000's verse was named best rap verse of the year by both Complex and HipHopDX.

Music video
A music video of the song was uploaded to West's official channel on May 8, 2022. It showcases photos of West (mostly in his childhood) with the faces animated to sync with the song's lyrics. The music video doesn't feature any of André 3000's vocals, possibly due to the controversy of the song being released without consent of his verses being censored. The video ends with a short video of Kanye rapping when he was a kid.

Personnel
Credits adapted from Tidal.

Music
 Dem Jointz – additional production
 Federico Vindver – additional production
 Fonzworth Bentley – additional production, vocal production
 Ojivolta – additional production
 BoogzDaBeast – co-production
 The Twilite Tone – co-production

Technical
 Maurizio "Irko" Sera – master engineering, mix engineering, remixing
 Rashade Benani Bevel - mix assistance
 Alejandro Rodriguez-Dawson – record engineering
 Andrew Drucker – record engineering
 Josh Berg – record engineering
 Kalam Ali Muttalib – record engineering

Charts

References

Kanye West songs
André 3000 songs
2021 songs
2021 singles
Song recordings produced by Kanye West
Songs written by Kanye West
Songs written by André 3000
Songs written by Pusha T
Songs written by Dem Jointz
Songs written by Malik Yusef
Songs written by Fonzworth Bentley